Ivan Augustus Murrell Peters (April 24, 1943 – October 8, 2006) was an outfielder in Major League Baseball who played for the Houston Colt .45's / Astros, San Diego Padres and Atlanta Braves in all or parts of nine seasons spanning 1963–1974. Listed at 6' 2", 195 lb., Murrell batted and threw right handed. He was born in Almirante, Panama.

Murrell played in part of four seasons for Houston teams before being chosen by San Diego in the 1968 Major League Baseball expansion draft. His most productive season came in 1970 with the Padres, when he posted career-highs in home runs (12), RBI (35), runs (41), hits (85) and games played (125). He played his last major league season for the Braves.

In a career that spanned a decade, Murrell was a .236 hitter with 33 home runs and 123 RBI in 564 games.

In 1989, Murrell joined the St. Lucie Legends of the Senior Professional Baseball Association, hitting .272 with five home runs in 47 games. He also worked as a scout and a minor league coach for the Houston Astros organization.

Murrell died in Stuart, Florida, at age 63.

Facts
Murrell was also an undefeated middleweight boxer and was selected to play on Panama's soccer team in the 1963 Pan American Games.
Created the Ivan Murrell Foundation, a charity that helps give underprivileged kids educational opportunities in and out of baseball.
  In Fresnillo they nicknamed him "La Pantera Panameña"

See also
List of players from Panama in Major League Baseball

External links
, or Houstros Astros website, or Ivan Murrell at Baseballbiography.com, or Retrosheet, or The Deadball Era , or  Pura Pelota (Venezuelan Winter League)

1943 births
2006 deaths
Alacranes de Durango players
Amarillo Gold Sox players
Angeles de Puebla players
Atlanta Braves players
Bravos de León players
Cachorros de León players
Cardenales de Lara players
Durham Bulls players
Hawaii Islanders players	
Houston Astros players
Houston Astros scouts
Houston Colt .45s players
Major League Baseball outfielders
Major League Baseball players from Panama
Mexican League baseball players
Moultrie Colt .22s players
Navegantes del Magallanes players
Panamanian expatriate baseball players in Venezuela
Oklahoma City 89ers players
Panamanian expatriate baseball players in Mexico
Panamanian expatriate baseball players in the United States
People from Changuinola District
San Diego Padres players
Saraperos de Saltillo players
St. Lucie Legends players
Tecolotes de Nuevo Laredo players
Tiburones de La Guaira players